John Henry Abel Frettingham (1871–1904) was an English footballer. Born in Nottingham, he played 56 times in The Football League for Lincoln City between 1894 and 1896, and later had a lengthy stint with New Brompton of the Southern League, where he was the club's top scorer for five consecutive seasons.

References

1871 births
1904 deaths
English footballers
Gillingham F.C. players
Lincoln City F.C. players
Leicester City F.C. players
Footballers from Nottingham
Association football forwards